RightForge is a conservative American limited liability company aimed at providing internet hosting for conservative causes that describes itself as "The first global Internet infrastructure company committed to American principles online". Founded in 2021, it aims to provide "cancel-proof" hosting services. The company's CEO, Martin Avila, has described the company as "absolutely ideological".

It provided the original infrastructure for the Donald Trump-backed social media network Truth Social.

In late August 2022, Fox Business reported that RightForge claims that it is owed $1.6M by Truth Social, and that RightForge is planning legal action over the dispute.

References

External links 
 

Technology companies of the United States
Web hosting
2021 establishments
Alt-tech